Beulah Quo (April 17, 1923 – October 23, 2002) was a Chinese-American actress and activist born in Stockton, California. The spelling of her last name changed from Kwoh to Quo because she was constantly asked if KWOH was a radio station. She starred in many films and television series beginning in the mid-1950s, and was best known for her appearances in General Hospital (1963), Chinatown (1974), and Brokedown Palace (1999). She was also an advocate of more and better screen roles for Asian actors, and founded several organizations in pursuit of that goal.

Early life
Beulah Quo was born Beulah Ong in Stockton, California as the only child of two Chinese immigrants. She received a bachelor's degree in Social Welfare from UC Berkeley and a master's degree from the University of Chicago. While completing her Master’s degree, Quo met her husband, Edwin Kwoh, who was then a Chinese doctoral student at Columbia University. She also published her master's thesis entitled “The Occupational Status of American-Born Chinese Male College Graduates” in the American Journal of Sociology.

Both Quo and her husband were involved in Chinese Christian activism throughout their studies. Quo was particularly active in the Lake Tahoe Chinese Christian Youth Conferences during the 1940s. In the time she was involved in leading these conferences, Quo led discussions advocating for cross-racial cooperation and spoke out against the internment of Japanese Americans during WWII.    

In the late 1940s, while she was working in China as a teacher, Quo escaped Communism on a U.S. destroyer along with her husband and infant son. After resettling, she also worked at the Chinese YWCA building, which is now the Chinese American National Museum and Learning Center.

Television and film career

While teaching sociology at a community college in Los Angeles, California, director Henry King was looking for an Asian dialect coach and instead hired Quo to play a small role in Love is a Many-Splendored Thing (1953). She played over 100 roles in television movies and series, as well as film. One of her notable television roles was in General Hospital, where she stayed for six years and played a housekeeper and confidante named Olin starting in 1985. Uncredited appearances that she made throughout her career in her earlier work included her first film, Love is a Many-Splendored Thing, Two Weeks In Another Town (1962), and Gypsy (1962). Her final featured film role was in Forbidden City in 2001 as Mrs. Lee; her last television appearance was in a 2002 episode of Law and Order: Criminal Intent.

Quo co-starred in a made-for-television drama, An Apple, An Orange a story of two immigrants and their differences in cultural, sociological and philosophical viewpoints while in midlife. The program, produced by Maryland Public TV in association with Baltimore's Center Stage was telecast nationally in prime time on PBS. It aired on Oregon Public Broadcasting. The author and dramatist, Diane Johnson, won an O. Henry Award for the story on which it was based.

Activism
In 1965, The East West Players, the first Asian-American repertory theater in the U.S., was co-founded by Quo and eight other actors, including James Hong. The East West Players continues to advocate for diverse representation and elimination of stereotypes of Asian-Americans in Hollywood and across mass media.

Quo was heavily involved in the high-profile and racially driven Vincent Chin case, producing a play to honor him entitled Carry The Tiger To The Mountain in July 1998. It was based on a true story of a Chinese-American man who was beaten to death in Detroit, Michigan, in 1982 by two white men who had mistaken him for a Japanese man. It premiered in West Virginia; Quo played Chin's mother, Lily Chin. The play was later performed in Los Angeles by the East West Players.

In 1997, Quo commissioned a musical project called "Heading East: California Asian Pacific American Experience" to promote and commemorate the history of Asian-Pacific Americans in California for the past 150 years.

Quo continued to dismiss any statements that Asians in leading roles are not "bankable", pointing out that Haing S. Ngor, cast  in The Killing Fields (1984), won the Oscar for best supporting actor, while Pat Morita was nominated for the same award for his role in The Karate Kid (1984).

Awards, nominations and honors
1978: Nominated for an Emmy for Outstanding Single Performance by a supporting actress in Meeting of Minds. Quo also co-narrated the audiobook version.

1990: "The Jimmie" Lifetime Achievement Award by the Asian Pacific American Artists, for her outstanding work on The Sand Pebbles (1966), MacArthur (1977), and Chinatown (1974). She also won a local Emmy award for her achievements on "James Wong Howe – The Man and His Movies", a documentary on the award-winning cinematographer James Wong Howe.

Death
On October 23, 2002, Beulah Quo died of heart failure during emergency cardiac surgery in La Mesa, California at the age of 79.
The East West Players have a  Beulah Quo and Edwin Kwoh Endowment set up to promote theater education.

Filmography
Films and television appearances are from IMDb.

Notes

External links 

 

1923 births
2002 deaths
American film actresses
American television actresses
University of California, Berkeley alumni
University of Chicago alumni
American actresses of Chinese descent
20th-century American actresses